JS Yaeshio (SS-598) is the ninth boat of the s. She was commissioned on 9 March 2006.

Construction and career
Yaeshio was laid down at Kawasaki Heavy Industries Kobe Shipyard on 15 January 2002 and launched on 4 November 2004. She was commissioned on 9 March 2006 and deployed to Yokohama.

The submarine participated in RIMPAC 2009 from 27 August to 8 December 2009.

On 14 January 2014, she left Yokosuka to participate in the RIMPAC 2014, stayed in the Hawaii and Guam areas to conduct various trainings, and returned to Yokosuka on 24 April.

Gallery

Citations

External links

2004 ships
Oyashio-class submarines
Ships built by Kawasaki Heavy Industries